Kachi Raqra (Quechua kachi salt, raqra fissure, crack, crevice, "salt crack (or crevice)", also spelled Cachiracra) is a mountain in the Cordillera Central in the Andes of Peru which reaches a height of approximately . It is located in the Lima Region, Yauyos Province, Huancaya District.

References 

Mountains of Peru
Mountains of Lima Region